The 1978 season was the ninth season of national competitive association football in Australia and 95th overall.

National teams

Australia national soccer team

Results and fixtures

Friendlies

Men's football

National Soccer League

Cup competitions

NSL Cup

Final

Retirements

References

External links
 Football Australia official website

1978 in Australian soccer
Seasons in Australian soccer